Giordano Orsini may refer to:
Giordano Bobone Orsini (died after 1154),  Jordan of Santa Susanna, Carthusian monk, created Cardinal Deacon
Giordano Orsini (died 1287), cardinal, brother of pope Nicholas III
Giordano Orsini (Senatore 1341), Rome's Senatore in 1341, nephew of Pope Nicholas III
Giordano Orsini (died 1438)
 (1525–1564), 
Jourdan des Ursins, a.k.a. Giordano degli Orsini (died 1564)